Air Mobility Command (AMC) is a major command (MAJCOM) of the U.S. Air Force. It is headquartered at Scott Air Force Base, Illinois, east of St. Louis, Missouri.

Air Mobility Command was established on 1 June 1992, and was formed from elements of the inactivated Military Airlift Command (MAC) and Strategic Air Command (SAC).  AMC melded MAC's worldwide airlift system of primarily C-5 Galaxy, C-141 Starlifter (later replaced by C-17 Globemaster III beginning in 1995), and C-130 Hercules airlift aircraft with SAC's tanker force of KC-135 Stratotanker and KC-10 Extender aerial refueling aircraft, the latter air refueling aircraft having been freed from their strategic nuclear strike commitment to SAC's B-52 Stratofortress and B-1 Lancer bomber fleet by the end of the Cold War and the dissolution of the Soviet Union.

Overview
Air Mobility Command's mission is to provide global air mobility. The command also plays a crucial role in providing humanitarian support at home and around the world. AMC Airmen – active duty, Air National Guard, and Air Force Reserve, augmented by the civilian airliners and flight crews of the Civil Reserve Air Fleet (CRAF) – provide airlift and aerial refueling for all of the United States armed forces. Many special duty and operational support aircraft (OSA) and stateside aeromedical evacuation missions are also assigned to AMC.

U.S. forces must be able to provide a rapid, tailored response with the capability to intervene against a well-equipped foe, hit hard and terminate quickly. Rapid global mobility lies at the heart of U.S. strategy in this environment.  Without the capability to project forces, there is no conventional deterrent. As the number of U.S. forces stationed overseas continue to decline, global interests remain, making the capabilities AMC can provide even more in demand.

Air Mobility Command also has the mission of establishing bare air bases in contingencies.  To accomplish this mission, AMC established two Contingency Response Wings, and operates the Eagle Flag exercise.

In addition to its status as a MAJCOM of the Air Force, AMC is also the Air Force component command of the United States Transportation Command (USTRANSCOM).  It provides airlift, special missions, aerial refueling, and aeromedical evacuation for the United States armed forces.  It also provides alert aerial refueling aircraft to the United States Strategic Command, and is a provider of theater airlift, aerial refueling, and aeromedical evacuation forces to the regional Unified Combatant Commands. AMC also operates VIP flights such as Air Force One, Air Force Two, and other Special Assignment Airlift Missions (SAAM).  Finally, AMC acts as the single manager, on behalf of United States Transportation Command (USTRANSCOM), for Military Space Available Travel.

Principal aircraft assets of the command include: C-17 Globemaster III, C-5 Galaxy, C-130 Hercules, KC-135 Stratotanker, KC-10 Extender, C-40 Clipper, C-37 Gulfstream V, and the C-21 Learjet. As of 2022, the command continues to integrate the KC-46 Pegasus within air refueling wings and air mobility wings in both the Active Component and the Air Reserve Component (ARC, i.e., the Air Force Reserve Command and the Air National Guard).

AMC also operates and maintains additional aircraft in support of high-profile VIP airlift include: VC-25, C-32, C-20G, C-20H, C-37 and the C-38, with the majority of that mission conducted by AMC's 89th Airlift Wing.

Additional long-range airlift aircraft are available during national emergencies through the Civil Reserve Air Fleet (CRAF), a fleet of civilian commercial aircraft committed to support the transportation of military forces and material in times of crisis.

AMC wings and groups
The Air Mobility Command consists of the following active duty units:

 Numbered Air Forces
 Eighteenth Air Force (18 AF)

 Air base wings
 87th Air Base Wing at Joint Base McGuire-Dix-Lakehurst (McGuire AFB), New Jersey
 628th Air Base Wing at Joint Base Charleston (Charleston AFB), South Carolina

 Air mobility wings
 60th Air Mobility Wing (C-5, C-17, KC-10) at Travis AFB, California
 305th Air Mobility Wing (C-17, KC-10) at Joint Base McGuire-Dix-Lakehurst (McGuire AFB), New Jersey
 375th Air Mobility Wing (C-21, C-40, KC-135) at Scott AFB, Illinois

 Airlift wings
 19th Airlift Wing (C-130J) at Little Rock AFB, Arkansas
 62nd Airlift Wing (C-17) at Joint Base Lewis-McChord (McChord AFB), Washington
 89th Airlift Wing (C-20, C-32, C-37, C-40, VC-25) at Joint Base Andrews (Andrews AFB), Maryland
 436th Airlift Wing (C-5, C-17) at Dover AFB, Delaware
 437th Airlift Wing (C-17) at Joint Base Charleston (Charleston AFB), South Carolina
 317th Airlift Wing (C-130J) at Dyess AFB, Texas

 Air refueling wings
 6th Air Refueling Wing (KC-135) at MacDill Air Force Base, Florida
 22d Air Refueling Wing (KC-135) at McConnell AFB, Kansas
 92d Air Refueling Wing (KC-135) at Fairchild AFB, Washington

 Other AMC organizations:
 Direct reporting units
 United States Air Force Expeditionary Center at Joint Base McGuire-Dix-Lakehurst (McGuire AFB), New Jersey
 Air and space operations centers
 618th Air and Space Operations Center (Tanker Airlift Control Center) at Scott AFB, Illinois
 Air mobility operations wings and groups and contingency response wings
 43d Air Mobility Operations Group at Pope Field (former Pope AFB), North Carolina
 515th Air Mobility Operations Wing at Joint Base Pearl Harbor–Hickam (Hickam AFB), Hawaii
 521st Air Mobility Operations Wing at Ramstein Air Base, Germany
 621st Contingency Response Wing at Joint Base McGuire-Dix-Lakehurst (McGuire AFB), New Jersey
 Bands
 USAF Band of Mid-America
 USAF Band of the Golden West
 Museums
 Air Mobility Command Museum at Dover AFB, Delaware
NOTE: Subordinate to the National Museum of the U.S. Air Force at Wright-Patterson AFB, Ohio

AFRC and ANG wings and groups operationally-gained by AMC

In addition to the active duty AMC units, numerous Air Force Reserve Command (AFRC) and Air National Guard (ANG) units equipped with C-5, C-17, C-21, C-38, C-40, C-130, LC-130, WC-130, KC-10, KC-135 and KC-46 aircraft are "operationally gained" by AMC.  These units train and exercise frequently and routinely provide augmentative operational support to AMC's active duty forces.  AFRC units, when mobilized to active duty, and ANG units, when mobilized to federal service and active duty, may be deployed overseas as part of AMC in Air Expeditionary Groups and Wings as directed by HQ AMC.

 Air Force Reserve Command (AFRC) units

 Fourth Air Force (4 AF) – March ARB, California (Air Force Reserve C-5, C-17, C-40, KC-135 and KC-10 units)

 315th Airlift Wing, Joint Base Charleston, South Carolina
 C-17 Globemaster III
 349th Air Mobility Wing, Travis AFB, California
 C-5 Galaxy, KC-10 Extender, C-17 Globemaster III
 433d Airlift Wing, Lackland AFB, Texas
 C-5 Galaxy
 434th Air Refueling Wing, Grissom ARB, Indiana
 KC-135 Stratotanker
 439th Airlift Wing, Westover ARB, Massachusetts
 C-5 Galaxy
 445th Airlift Wing, Wright-Patterson AFB, Ohio
 C-17 Globemaster III
 446th Airlift Wing, McChord AFB, Washington
 C-17 Globemaster III
 452d Air Mobility Wing, March ARB, California
 C-17 Globemaster III, KC-135R Stratotanker
 459th Air Refueling Wing, Andrews AFB, Maryland
 KC-135 Stratotanker
 507th Air Refueling Wing, Tinker AFB, Oklahoma
 KC-135 Stratotanker

 512th Airlift Wing, Dover AFB, Delaware
 C-5 Galaxy, C-17 Globemaster III
 514th Air Mobility Wing, Joint Base McGuire-Dix-Lakehurst, New Jersey
 KC-10 Extender, C-17 Globemaster III
 911th Airlift Wing, Pittsburgh IAP Air Reserve Station, Pennsylvania 
 C-17 Globemaster III
 914th Air Refueling Wing, Niagara Falls ARS, New York
 KC-135 Stratotanker
 916th Air Refueling Wing, Seymour Johnson AFB, North Carolina
 KC-46 Pegasus
 927th Air Refueling Wing, MacDill AFB, Florida
 KC-135 Stratotanker
 931st Air Refueling Wing, McConnell AFB, Kansas
 KC-135 Stratotanker
 932d Airlift Wing, Scott AFB, Illinois
 C-40 Clipper
 940th Air Refueling Wing, Beale AFB, California
 KC-135 Stratotanker

 Twenty-Second Air Force (22 AF) – Dobbins ARB, Georgia (Air Force Reserve C-130 and WC-130 units)

 94th Airlift Wing (C-130H Hercules)
 Dobbins Air Reserve Base, Georgia
 302d Airlift Wing (C-130H Hercules)
 Peterson Air Force Base, Colorado
 403d Wing (C-130J and WC-130J Super Hercules)
 Keesler Air Force Base, Mississippi
 908th Airlift Wing (C-130H Hercules)
 Maxwell Air Force Base, Alabama
 NOTE:  908 AW transitioning missions; extant C-130H aircraft transferred Apr 2022

 910th Airlift Wing (C-130H Hercules)
 Youngstown-Warren Air Reserve Station, Ohio
 913th Airlift Group (C-130H Hercules)
 Little Rock Air Force Base, Arkansas
 934th Airlift Wing (C-130H Hercules)
 Minneapolis-St Paul Joint Air Reserve Station, Minnesota

 Air National Guard (ANG) units
 ANG air mobility units currently operate the C-21, C-17, C-38, C-40, C-130, LC-130 and KC-135, but are not assigned to a particular Numbered Air Force in the Air National Guard.  Instead, they report to AMC via the National Guard Bureau (NGB).

 101st Air Refueling Wing, Bangor Air National Guard Base, Maine
 KC-135 Stratotanker
 103d Airlift Wing, Bradley International Airport, Connecticut
 C-130H Hercules
 105th Airlift Wing, Stewart Air National Guard Base, New York
 C-17 Globemaster III
 108th Air Refueling Wing, Joint Base McGuire-Dix-Lakehurst, New Jersey
 KC-135 Stratotanker
 109th Airlift Wing, Stratton Air National Guard Base, New York
 C-130H Hercules and LC-130H Hercules 
 113th Wing, Joint Base Andrews, District of Columbia
 C-38 Courier, C-40 Clipper
  NOTE:  Composite wing with F-16 fighter & C-38/C-40 airlift aircraft.  F-16 assets gained by ACC; C-38/C-40 assets gained by AMC.
 117th Air Refueling Wing, Sumpter Smith Air National Guard Base, Alabama
 KC-135 Stratotanker
 120th Airlift Wing, Great Falls Air National Guard Base, Montana
 C-130H Hercules
 121st Air Refueling Wing, Rickenbacker Air National Guard Base, Ohio
 KC-135 Stratotanker
 123d Airlift Wing, Louisville Air National Guard Base, Kentucky
 C-130H Hercules
 126th Air Refueling Wing, Scott AFB, Illinois
 KC-135 Stratotanker
 127th Wing, Selfridge Air National Guard Base, Michigan
 KC-135 Stratotanker
 NOTE:  Composite wing with A-10 fighter and KC-135 aerial refueling aircraft.  A-10 assets gained by ACC; KC-135 assets gained by AMC.
 128th Air Refueling Wing, General Mitchell Air National Guard Base, Wisconsin 
 KC-135 Stratotanker
 130th Airlift Wing, McLaughlin Air National Guard Base, West Virginia
 C-130H Hercules
 133d Airlift Wing, Minneapolis–Saint Paul Joint Air Reserve Station, Minnesota
 C-130H Hercules
 134th Air Refueling Wing, McGhee Tyson Air National Guard Base, Tennessee
 KC-135 Stratotanker
 136th Airlift Wing, Naval Air Station Joint Reserve Base Fort Worth, Texas
 C-130H Hercules
 139th Airlift Wing, Rosecrans Air National Guard Base, Missouri
 C-130H Hercules
 140th Wing, Buckley Space Force Base, Colorado
 C-21 Learjet
 NOTE:  Composite wing with F-16 fighter and C-21 airlift aircraft.  F-16 assets gained by ACC; C-21 assets gained by AMC.
 141st Air Refueling Wing, Fairchild AFB, Washington 
 KC-135 Stratotanker

 143d Airlift Wing, Quonset Air National Guard Base, Rhode Island
 C-130J Super Hercules
 145th Airlift Wing, Charlotte Air National Guard Base, North Carolina
 C-17 Globemaster
 146th Airlift Wing, Channel Islands Air National Guard Station, California
 C-130J Super Hercules
 151st Air Refueling Wing, Roland R. Wright Air National Guard Base, Utah
 KC-135 Stratotanker
 152d Airlift Wing, Reno Air National Guard Base, Nevada
 C-130H Hercules
 153d Airlift Wing, Cheyenne Air National Guard Base, Wyoming
 C-130H Hercules
 155th Air Refueling Wing, Lincoln Air National Guard Base, Nebraska
 KC-135 Stratotanker
 156th Wing, Muñiz Air National Guard Base, Puerto Rico
 NOTE: As of 2018, transitioned from a C-130E airlift wing to a non-flying contingency response wing mission
 157th Air Refueling Wing, Pease Air National Guard Base, New Hampshire
 KC-46 Pegasus
 161st Air Refueling Wing, Goldwater Air National Guard Base, Arizona
 KC-135 Stratotanker
 164th Airlift Wing, Memphis Air National Guard Base, Tennessee
 C-17 Globemaster III
 165th Airlift Wing, Savannah Air National Guard Base (Travis Field), Georgia 
 C-130H Hercules
 166th Airlift Wing, New Castle Air National Guard Base, Delaware
 C-130H Hercules
 167th Airlift Wing, Shepherd Field Air National Guard Base, West Virginia
 C-17 Globemaster III
 171st Air Refueling Wing, Pittsburgh Air National Guard Base, Pennsylvania
 KC-135 Stratotanker
 172d Airlift Wing, Jackson-Evers International Airport, Mississippi
 C-17 Globemaster III
 179th Airlift Wing, Mansfield Lahm Air National Guard Base, Ohio
 C-130H Hercules
 182d Airlift Wing, Peoria Air National Guard Base, Illinois
 C-130H Hercules
 185th Air Refueling Wing, Sioux City Air National Guard Base (Colonel Bud Day Field), Iowa
 KC-135 Stratotanker
 186th Air Refueling Wing, Key Field Air National Guard Base, Mississippi
 KC-135 Stratotanker
 189th Airlift Wing, Little Rock Air Force Base, Arkansas
 C-130H Hercules
 190th Air Refueling Wing, Forbes Field Air National Guard Base, Kansas
 KC-135 Stratotanker

 Civil Reserve Air Fleet

Operations

AMC has undergone considerable change since its establishment.

Focusing on the core mission of strategic air mobility, the command divested itself of infrastructure and forces not directly related to Global Reach. Divestments included the former Air Rescue Service, the Air Force Rescue Coordination Center (AFRCC), intratheater aeromedical airlift forces based overseas, and much of the operational support airlift fleet.  Most of these activities were transferred to other commands, such as Air Combat Command (ACC).  ACC would later inactivate the Air Rescue Service while continuing to maintain the AFRCC under 1st Air Force.

However, all KC-10 Extender and most KC-135 Stratotanker air refueling aircraft initially assigned to Air Combat Command following the disestablishment of Strategic Air Command (SAC) were transferred to AMC, along with Grand Forks AFB, McConnell AFB and Fairchild AFB.

As a result of the Global War on Terrorism, on 1 October 2003, AMC underwent a major restructuring, bringing a war fighting role to its numbered air force. AMC reactivated Eighteenth Air Force (18 AF) and established it as its main war fighting force.  As subordinate components of 18 AF, AMC redesignated its two former numbered air forces as Expeditionary Mobility Task Forces (EMTF).  Fifteenth Air Force was redesignated as the 15th Expeditionary Mobility Task Force (15 EMTF), headquartered at Travis AFB, and Twenty-First Air Force was redesignated as the 21st Expeditionary Mobility Task Force (21 EMTF), headquartered at McGuire AFB.

AMC's ability to provide global reach is tested daily. From providing fuel, supplies and aeromedical support to troops on the frontline of the Global War on Terrorism, to providing humanitarian supplies to hurricane, flood, and earthquake victims both at home and abroad, AMC has been engaged in almost nonstop operations since its inception. Command tankers and airlifters have supported peacekeeping and humanitarian efforts in Afghanistan, Bosnia, Iraq, Cambodia, Somalia, Rwanda and Haiti, and continue to play a vital role in the ongoing Global War on Terrorism. The USAF believes that air mobility is a national asset of growing importance for responding to emergencies and protecting national interests around the globe.

AMC coordinates wildlife management on overseas runways between several agencies, including deployments in southwest Asia. Where necessary AMC cooperates outside the DOD such as with the United States Department of Agriculture (USDA). This includes obtaining USDA bird netting solutions to fill the military's need for bird strike defense.

Aircraft
AMC accepted its first C-17 Globemaster III at Charleston AFB, South Carolina, on 14 June 1993, and declared initial operational capability on 17 January 1995. AMC's second C-17 wing was established at McChord AFB, Washington, in July 1999. The versatile C-17, America's future core military airlifter, is a key player in the Air Force's post-Cold War strategy of "global reach, global power".

The C-17 replaced the C-141 Starlifter fleet inherited from Military Airlift Command (MAC).  C-141s were retired as C-17s were accepted into the inventory.  First seeing operational service in 1965 under the Military Air Transport Service (MATS), the last Starlifters were retired in the early 2000s. By 2004, the C-141 left AMC service with active duty USAF units, being confined to Air Force Reserve and Air National Guard units for the remainder of its operational service life.  In 2004, 2005, and 2006, the C-141s assigned to the 445 AW participated in missions to Iraq and Afghanistan, mostly for the medical evacuation of wounded service members. The last eight C-141s were officially retired in 2006.

The C-5 Galaxy airlifter, also inherited from MAC, is being modernized and upgraded into the C-5M Super Galaxy model. It is planned to modernize all C-5Bs and C-5Cs and many of the C-5As to the C-5M standard.  The first C-5M conversion was completed on 16 May 2006, and performed its first flight on 19 June 2006.  It is estimated that the modifications will extend the service life of the C-5 to about 2040.

Most legacy models of the C-130 Hercules (e.g., C-130E, C-130H, C-130H2) in AMC, AFRC and ANG units have been or will eventually be replaced by the C-130J Super Hercules. The C-130 family has the longest continuous production run of any military aircraft in history and has served in every branch of the U.S. armed forces except the U.S. Army and U.S. Space Force. During more than 50 years of service, the C-130 has participated in military, civilian and humanitarian aid operations.  It is likely that future improvements to the C-130 will mean the design will be in service into the foreseeable future.

The upgrades of the inherited Strategic Air Command KC-135 Stratotanker to E, R, RT and T models have extended their airframe and powerplant lifetimes to 36,000 (E) and 39,000 flying hours (R, RT and T), respectively.  The last KC-135E was retired in 2009 and all remaining operational USAF KC-135 aircraft are of the KC-135R, KC-135RT or KC-135T series.  Acquired by SAC in the late 1950s, according to the Air Force, only a few KC-135s would reach these lifetime limits before 2040; but at that time, some of the aircraft would be about 80 years old. The Air Force estimates that their current fleet of KC-135s have between 12,000 and 14,000 flying hours on them, only 33 percent of the lifetime flying hour limit and none will meet the limit until 2040.  Therefore, the USAF has decided to replace the KC-135 fleet. However, since there were originally over 500 KC-135s with the since-retired KC-135E included, these aircraft will be replaced gradually, with the first batch of about 100 aircraft to be replaced in the current buy. The effort to replace the KC-135 has been marked by intense controversy.

The 59 KC-10 Extender tankers, originally acquired in the 1980s by SAC, have been operated largely in the refueling of large numbers of fighter aircraft on ferry flights, the refueling of heavy bomber or other transport aircraft, or as supplemental airlift aircraft for palletized cargo, augmenting the C-5 and C-17 fleet. Conversely, the KC-135 fleet has operated largely in the in-theater role.  In an attempt to modernize the platform, the USAF has awarded Boeing a US$216 million contract to upgrade its fleet of 59 aircraft with new communication, navigation and surveillance and air traffic management system to operate into the 2020s.

History
The direct successor to the USAF Military Airlift Command, the emblem of Air Mobility Command retained the historic emblem of not only the Military Airlift Command, but also the Military Air Transport Service (MATS), established in 1948 as the first Department of Defense Unified Command. The heritage of Air Mobility Command also includes the air refueling heritage inherited from the historic Strategic Air Command.

Lineage
  Established as Air Mobility Command and activated on 1 June 1992
 Consolidated with Military Airlift Command on 1 October 2016

Assignments
 Headquarters, United States Air Force, 1 June 1992 – present

Stations
 Scott Air Force Base, Illinois, 1 June 1992 – present

Major components
Air Forces
 Fifteenth Air Force (15 AF), 1 June 1992 – 1 October 2003
 Redesignated 15th Expeditionary Mobility Task Force (15 EMTF) and assigned to Eighteenth Air Force, 1 October 2003
 Eighteenth Air Force (18 AF), 1 October 2003 – present
 Twenty-First Air Force (21 AF), 1 June 1992 – 1 October 2003
 Redesignated 21st Expeditionary Mobility Task Force (21 EMTF) and assigned to Eighteenth Air Force, 1 October 2003
 Twenty-Second Air Force (22 AF), 1 June 1992 – 1 July 1993
 Reassigned from AMC to Air Force Reserve Command (AFRC), 1 July 1993

Direct Reporting Units
 Air Mobility Command Tanker Airlift Control Center (later, 618th Air Operations Center (Tanker Airlift Control Center)), 1 June 1992 – 1 October 2003, unknown–present
 USAF Air Mobility School (later, Air Mobility Warfare Center, USAF Expeditionary Center), 1 June 1992 – present

Services
 Air Combat Camera Service, 1 June 1992 – 1 October 1994
 Air Rescue Service, 1 June 1992 – 1 February 1993
 Defense Courier Service, 1 June 1992 – 1 January 1995, 15 October 1998 – 1 October 2004

List of commanders

See also
Surface Deployment and Distribution Command (U.S. Army)
Military Sealift Command (U.S. Navy)
Phoenix Mobility Program

References

External links
 Air Mobility Command home page
 Space-A Online Registration home page

Military units and formations established in 1992
Major commands of the United States Air Force
Air force transport commands
1992 establishments in Illinois